Syzygium unipunctatum is a small tree in the family Myrtaceae. It is endemic to the rainforests of the Wet Tropics of Queensland.

Taxonomy
This species was first described by Bernie Hyland as Waterhousea unipunctata and was published in the Australian Journal of Botany in 1983. In 2006 Craven, Biffin and Ashton published a paper in which they transferred all species in the related genera Acmena, Acmenosperma, Cleistocalyx, Piliocalyx and Waterhousea to Syzygium.

Etymology
The genus name Syzygium comes from the Ancient Greek sýzygos, meaning 'joined', 'yoked', or 'paired', and refers to the paired leaves. The species epithet unipunctatum is derived from the Latin words unus, meaning 'one' or 'single', and punctum, meaning 'puncture', 'spot', or 'moment'. The meaning of the epithet is unclear.

Distribution and habitat
Syzygium punctatum has a range that is restricted to rainforested areas of north east Queensland.

Conservation
This species is listed by the Queensland Department of Environment and Science as least concern. , it has not been assessed by the IUCN.

References

External links
 
 
 View a map of recorded sightings of this species at the Australasian Virtual Herbarium
 View observations of this species on iNaturalist
 See images of this species on Flickriver

unipunctatum
Endemic flora of Australia
Flora of Queensland
Taxa described in the 20th century
Taxa named by Bernard Hyland
Taxa named by Lyndley Craven